This is the list of television programs currently and formerly broadcast by Shakthi TV.

Currently broadcast

Drama series

Reality / non-scripted shows

Formerly broadcast

Sun TV drama series

 Aathira
 Chinna Papa Periya Papa
 Devayani
 EMI
 Ival Oru Thodarkathai
 Mahabratham
 Maragatha Veenai
 Sakthi

Vijay TV drama series

 Ithu kadhala ?
 Kalyanam Mudhal Kadhal Varai
 Kaviyanjali
 Neeli
 Nee Naan Aval
 Office

IBC Tamil drama series
 Yazhini

Colors TV drama series
 Naagin as Neeya
 Mahakaali

Shakthi TV
Shakthi TV